German submarine U-149 was a Type IID U-boat of Nazi Germany's Kriegsmarine during World War II. Her keel was laid down on 25 May 1940 by Deutsche Werke in Kiel as yard number 278. She was launched on 19 October 1940 and commissioned on 13 November with Kapitänleutnant Horst Höltring in command.

U-146 began her service life with the 1st U-boat Flotilla. She was then assigned to the 22nd flotilla, where she remained for the rest of the war, including time on a single patrol.

She surrendered on 5 May 1945 and was sunk as part of Operation Deadlight on 21 December.

Design
German Type IID submarines were enlarged versions of the original Type IIs. U-149 had a displacement of  when at the surface and  while submerged. She had two shafts and two  propellers.

U-149 was fitted with three  torpedo tubes at the bow, five torpedoes or up to twelve Type A torpedo mines, and a  anti-aircraft gun. The boat had a complement of 25.

Operational career
U-149s one patrol was carried out within the confines of the Baltic Sea, but she did sink the Soviet submarine M-99 on 27 July 1941, north-west of Dagö Island before returning to her base at Gotenhafen, (now Gdynia in modern Poland).

Fate
The boat surrendered at the German island of Heligoland on 5 May 1945.

Summary of raiding history

References

Notes

Citations

Bibliography

External links

German Type II submarines
U-boats commissioned in 1940
World War II submarines of Germany
1940 ships
Ships built in Kiel
Operation Deadlight
U-boats sunk in 1945
Maritime incidents in December 1945